The men's BMX freestyle event at the 2020 Summer Olympics took place on 31 July and 1 August 2021 at the Ariake Urban Sports Park. 9 cyclists from 8 nations competed.

Background

This was the debut appearance of the event, with freestyle BMX added to the programme for the first time (BMX racing was added in 2008).

The reigning (2021) World Champion is Logan Martin of Australia, who was also the 2017 winner and 2019 silver medalist.

A preview by Olympics.com noted the favourites as Brandon Loupos of Australia (the 2019 World Champion), Daniel Dhers of Venezuela, and Rim Nakamura of Japan. Australia had hoped to have both Martin and Loupos compete. The final rankings, however, put the United States as the #1-ranked nation. This meant that the United States was the only nation able to send two cyclists in the event; Australia, as the #2-ranked nation, could send only one. Further, Loupos was seriously injured during the 2021 World Championship less than two months before the Games, which would have kept him from competing in any case. Martin was selected as Australia's only men's BMX freestyle rider.

The United States selected Justin Dowell (2018 World Champion) and Nick Bruce (2019 bronze medalist); the Americans finished the 2021 World Championship with 3 cyclists in the top 5 places (Bruce 5th, Dowell 4th, and Daniel Sandoval taking silver).

Qualification

A National Olympic Committee (NOC) could enter up to 2 qualified cyclists in the BMX freestyle. Quota places are allocated to the NOC, which selects the cyclists. There were 9 quota places available, allocated as follows:

 UCI nation ranking (6 places): Top NOC earns 2 places. NOCs ranked 2nd to 5th each earn 1 place.
 2019 World Championships (2 places): The top 2 NOCs at the 2019 UCI Urban Cycling World Championships, which have not yet earned any quota places, each earn 1 place.
 Host place (1 place): Host nation Japan was guaranteed 1 place.

Competition format

The competition is a two-round tournament, with a seeding round and a final. Each round has the cyclists all do two runs. The runs are 60 seconds long. Five judges give scores between 0.00 and 99.99 based on the difficulty and execution of the rider's run; the scores are averaged for a total run score. In the seeding round, the rider's two run scores are averaged to give a total seeding score. These seeding scores are used to determine the start order of the cyclists in the final, providing a knowledge advantage to the later riders. In the final, only the better score of the two runs counts.

Schedule

The event took place over two consecutive days.

Results

Seeding 
The seeding phase determines the start order for the final. The best ranked rider from the seeding will start last in the final.

Final

See also 
 Cycling at the 2020 Summer Olympics – Women's BMX freestyle
 Cycling at the 2020 Summer Olympics – Men's BMX racing
 Skateboarding at the 2020 Summer Olympics – Men's park
 2021 UCI Urban Cycling World Championships

References

Men's BMX freestyle
BMX at the Summer Olympics
2021 in BMX
Men's events at the 2020 Summer Olympics